Eisenhower Auditorium (originally named "University Auditorium") is Pennsylvania State University's largest performing arts venue. Located centrally on the University Park campus, Eisenhower Auditorium hosts more than 200 plays, musicals, concerts, lectures, and commencements annually.

Construction
Construction of Eisenhower Auditorium began in the summer of 1971 and was completed in October 1973. Installation of technical equipment ended in January 1974 and the building was dedicated under its original name "University Auditorium" on May 8, 1974.

Seating
Seating at Eisenhower Auditorium is divided into three levels- the orchestra, the grand tier, and the balcony. There are no middle aisles in the auditorium.

Extended Sunset
In October 2019, artist and associate professor of art at the University of Albany Adam Frelin installed his work, Extended Sunset in the six vertical windows of the facade of Eisenhower Auditorium. The work features a colorful Pennsylvania sunset, backlit by LED lamp on an astronomical timer system. The work first illuminates as the actual sunset begins and then fades as the sun rises in the morning.

References 

Performing arts centers in Pennsylvania
Pennsylvania State University campus
University and college buildings completed in 1973
1973 establishments in Pennsylvania